

Sampson R. Urbino (1818-1896) or S.R. Urbino was a German-born bookseller, publisher and library proprietor in 19th-century Boston, Massachusetts, specializing in foreign-language books.

Prior to bookselling, Urbino worked as a teacher in Boston. In the mid-1850s he bought "Miss Elizabeth P. Peabody's circulating library and book-store on West Street. He developed the library and also added German, French, and books in other foreign languages to his stock. He then ... began publishing the well-known series of Ahn's and Ollendorf's readers and grammars, and other text-books." The business operated from an office on Summer Street (ca.1856) Winter Street (ca.1857-1861) School Street (ca.1864-1865) and Bromfield Street (ca.1870).

Urbino sold part of his textbook enterprise "to Henry Holt & Co. shortly before retiring from business in 1865. He sold his business to De Vries, Ibarra & Co., to whom he also transferred the services of Mr. Carl Schoenhof and Miss Fanny Moeller."

He supported the Free Soil party; the 20th Massachusetts Volunteer Infantry during the Civil War; and the National Liberal League. He belonged to the American Association for the Promotion of Social Science. In 1889 "S.R. Urbino and 30 others" presented a petition to the Massachusetts House of Representatives asking for "legislation providing that one-third of the members of school committees in cities and towns shall be women."

Urbino lived in Roxbury and Newton, Massachusetts, and was married to Levina Buoncuore Urbino, a writer and translator.

See also
 List of booksellers in Boston

Published by S.R. Urbino
 L. Boncoeur [i.e. Levina Buoncuore Urbino]. L'instructeur de l'enfrance: (A first book for children), 2nd ed. 1864
 Goethe. Faust, Eine Tragoedie von Goethe: Erster Theil. With English notes. 1864. 
 Goethe, E.C.F. Krauss. Iphigenie auf Tauris. With English notes. 1865. 
 Goethe, E.C.F. Krauss. Hermann und Dorothea. With English notes. 1866. 
 Explanatory text to S.R. Urbino's charts of the animal kingdom. 1869. "Revised and corrected by Samuel Kneeland" Google books
 L.B. Cuore [i.e. Levina Buoncuore Urbino]. Italian conversation-grammar, 5th ed. 1870 Google books
 Emil Otto. German conversation-grammar, 21st ed. 1870.
 M. Lamé Fleury; translated by Susan M. Lane. Ancient history told to children. 1870 Google books
 Eugénie Foa. Le petit Robinson de Paris, 4th ed. 1870

References

1818 births
1896 deaths
Businesspeople from Boston
American publishers (people)
19th-century American businesspeople